Klamer may refer to:
 Klamer, a tributary of the Klasop River of West Papua
 a surname; notable people with this name include:
 Evan Klamer (1923–1978), Danish cyclist
 Marian Klamer (born 1965), Dutch linguist
 Rachel Klamer (born 1990), Dutch triathlete
 Reuben Klamer, American inventor

See also 
 Franz Klammer (born 1953), Austrian ski racer